The Royal Hudsons are a series of semi-streamlined 4-6-4 "Hudson" type steam locomotives owned by the Canadian Pacific Railway (CPR) and built by Montreal Locomotive Works (MLW). The engines were built in 1937. In 1939, King George VI allowed the CPR to use the term after Royal Hudson number 2850 transported the royal train across Canada with no need of replacement. These locomotives were in service between 1937 and 1960. Four of them have been preserved. No. 2839 was used to power excursions for the Southern Railway Steam Program between 1979 and 1980. No. 2860 was used for excursion service in British Columbia between 1974 and 1999, then again between 2006 and 2010.

Royal visit
In 1939, King George VI and Queen Elizabeth visited Canada, arriving at Wolfe's Cove, Quebec, on 17 May 1939. This was the first time that a reigning monarch had visited Canada. The King and Queen took a tour of the country by rail. The CPR and the Canadian National Railways (CNR) shared the honours of transporting the royal train across the country, with the CPR undertaking the westbound journey, from Quebec City to Vancouver. The steam locomotive that the CPR used to pull the train was numbered 2850, a 4-6-4 built by Montreal Locomotive works. The King, somewhat of a railbuff, rode in the cab when possible. The King was so impressed with the performance of 2850 and its class, that after the tour, the King gave the CPR permission to use the term "Royal Hudson" for the semi-streamlined locomotives of the class (numbered 2820–2859, 2860-2864 were built one year later as Royal Hudsons) and to display royal crowns on the running board skirts. This was the only time a locomotive outside of the United Kingdom was given royal status by the reigning monarch.

Regular service
The CPR owned a total of 65 class H1 Hudsons built by MLW. Classes H1a and H1b, numbered 2800–2819, were not semi-streamlined and were not "Royal" Hudsons. The Canadian Pacific Railway owned 30 class H1c Royal Hudsons, numbered 2820–2849, built in 1937, 10 class H1d Royal Hudsons, numbered 2850–2859, built in 1938, and five class H1e Royal Hudsons, numbered 2860–2864, built in 1940. The class H1c and class H1d Royal Hudsons were used in passenger and freight service in the East and in the Central Provinces. The class H1e (Nos. 2860 through 2864) Royal Hudsons were all built as oil-burners for the service between Vancouver and Revelstoke where they worked until they were displaced by diesels. At the end of 1952 the H1c and H1d were assigned to the sheds in Montreal (10), Toronto (7), Fort William (4), Winnipeg (17) and Calgary (2) – the brackets showing the assigned number of locomotives. All five H1e were assigned to Vancouver.

The Royal Hudsons were used on all main lines of the CPR except Montreal–Saint John due to bridge weight restrictions. They worked almost all transcontinental passenger trains. The Dominion was hauled by a Royal Hudson  from Toronto to Fort William and by another one  further on to Calgary. There, a more powerful Selkirk took over till Revelstoke and another Royal Hudson brought the train over the last  to Vancouver.

By 1960, all of the 20 Hudsons and 45 Royal Hudsons had been retired due to having been completely replaced by diesel locomotives.

Excursions

One Royal Hudson,  2860, was later used in excursion service. A class H1e Royal Hudson, it was built for the CPR by MLW in June 1940. It was the first locomotive of five to be built new as Royal Hudson and delivered with painted cast-brass crowns affixed to its skirts. Between 1940 and 1956 it hauled transcontinental passenger trains between Revelstoke and Vancouver. It was damaged in a derailment outside of Vancouver in 1956, but by 1957 it had been refurbished and was transferred to Winnipeg for prairie service. It was withdrawn from service in May 1959 and sat on the scrap line for five years. It was sold to the Vancouver Railway Museum Association in 1964. However, the association was unable to find a place to display the locomotive and it remained in storage at the Drake Street shops in Vancouver. Once again the locomotive faced the risk of being scrapped, but she was sold to Joe W. Hussey in 1970.

In 1973 Hussey sold 2860 to the British Columbia government. The locomotive was restored by Robert E. Swanson's Railway Appliance Research Ltd. team and the staff of the CPR Drake Street Roundhouse shops beginning on 25 November 1973 and then operated by the British Columbia Department of Travel Industry with the cooperation of the British Columbia Railway. The BCR commenced a Royal Hudson excursion service between North Vancouver and Squamish on 20 June 1974. By the end of the 1974 tourist season, 47,295 passengers had been carried and the excursion was deemed successful. It was the only regularly scheduled steam excursion over mainline trackage in North America. The excursion operated between May and October, from Wednesday through Saturday. It also travelled North America in the late 1970s as a promotion for BC tourism. It quickly became one of British Columbia's main tourist attractions and an icon of Canadian steam power.

While the engine was being prepared for Christmas trains at the end of the 1999 tourist season, 2860 was found to have serious leaks from the superheater elements. The superheaters and the arch tubes were known to be life expired and some other fairly major boiler work was required. A variety of factors prevented BC Rail from carrying out the repairs immediately, including the fact that Canadian Pacific 2816 was in the BCR shop being rebuilt under contract, and that all BC Rail passenger services were under threat in the lead up to the eventual privatization of BC Rail. After the election of the BC Liberal government in 2001 all passenger services were gradually phased out starting with the Royal Hudson excursion. The Royal Hudson excursion used other locomotives during the 2000 and 2001 seasons, such as back up locomotive 3716 (an ex-Canadian Pacific 2-8-0 which is also provincially owned and currently operates on the Kettle Valley Steam Railway in Summerland).

, the 2860 was still owned by the British Columbia government, but was on permanent loan to the West Coast Railway Association (WCRA) and housed at the West Coast Railway Heritage Park in Squamish, but had been seen on the CNR line from Squamish to North Vancouver in late April 2009.

2860's Return to steam

On 28 September 2006, the Royal Hudson steamed into the WCRA Squamish station under its own power for the first time since October 1999. The restoration took just over one year with a cost of over $250,000. Money for the restoration was provided wholly by donations. The WCRA also had difficulty locating missing parts. Some of the major components, such as the trailing truck, were borrowed from sister engine 2850. The borrowed parts had to be returned when 2850 was put on public display. WCRA replaced the borrowed tailing truck with one that was being used at a mine, which had salvaged the truck from a Royal Hudson due for scrap. The truck turned out to have been taken off of 2860 when it was sitting on the scrap line in the 1960s. The association plans to operate 2860 on excursion runs and at special events. Due to the strict "no steam" policy that CP and CN have, the excursions are restricted to special occasions only. 2860 is steamed up regularly for publicity and to salute passing passenger trains.

On 9 December 2010, the ex-CP 2860 and the Royal Hudson trainset were scheduled to depart North Vancouver for Squamish at 12:30 pm on the last of its scheduled excursion trips in 2010. The December 9 trip was likely its last for a long time.

Southern 2839

Royal Hudson No. 2839 was once destined for a museum in eastern Canada and wound up being sold to a group of owners in Pennsylvania. After a restoration to full working order to full CPR livery (with Southern lettering), the engine was leased to the Southern Railway for their steam excursion program in 1979–1980, but was found that the locomotive was not powerful enough for their excursions. During her brief career with the Southern, 2839 earned the nickname "beer can" due to the Royal Hudson's cylindrical streamlined design. After being returned from the Southern, the engine was stored on the Blue Mountain and Reading Railroad (BM&R) before being stored near Allentown, Pennsylvania. The BM&R attempted to restore and run her on excursions, but ultimately 2839 was sold. After a series of owners, the engine was shipped on a flat car from Pennsylvania to the Nethercutt Collection in Sylmar, California, where it was cosmetically restored and put on display outside the museum with a Pullman car.

Royal Hudson locomotive 2839 appeared in the 1980 Academy Award-winning movie Coal Miner's Daughter. The train is in Southern Railway guise and can be seen in operation in two scenes. However  the Southern never owned any 4-6-4 Hudson locomotives.

Preservation

Four Royal Hudsons have been preserved (Hudson  2816 is not streamlined and thus is not "Royal").
2839 Operated in the 1970s and 1980s. Now at the Nethercutt Collection and Museum, Sylmar, California. Good cosmetic shape, displayed outside.
2850 The locomotive that hauled the Royal Train and known as "The" Royal Hudson, served a long career until 1960 when it was retired and is now preserved at the Canadian Railway Museum at Delson/Saint-Constant, Quebec. Very good cosmetic and mechanical shape, displayed indoors.
2858 Preserved at the Canada Science and Technology Museum at Ottawa. Good cosmetic shape, displayed inside.
2860 Preserved at the West Coast Railway Association at Squamish, BC. First CPR Hudson built as a Royal Hudson, one of the last five built. Operated excursions 1974-1999 and 2006–2010. On static display inside.

See also

References

 History of the Royal Hudsons

External links

Canadian Pacific Railway locomotives
Steam locomotives of Canada
Preserved steam locomotives of Canada
MLW locomotives
4-6-4 locomotives
Streamlined steam locomotives
Passenger locomotives
Railway locomotives introduced in 1937